The 1988 1000 km Spa was the ninth round of the 1988 World Sportscar Championship season.  It took place at the Circuit de Spa-Francorchamps, Belgium on September 18, 1988.

Official results
Class winners in bold.  Cars failing to complete 75% of the winner's distance marked as Not Classified (NC).

Statistics
 Pole Position - #62 Team Sauber Mercedes - 2:02.250
 Fastest Lap - #2 Silk Cut Jaguar - 2:22.120
 Average Speed - 163.533 km/h

References

 
 

S
6 Hours of Spa-Francorchamps
1000km